Thitarodes varius is a species of moth of the family Hepialidae. It was described by Staudinger in 1887, and is known from the Russian Far East.

References

External links
Hepialidae genera

Moths described in 1887
Hepialidae